Hugues Stephane Bernard Mulliez (born 7 August 1975) is a French business entrepreneur. He is presently Group Chairman at Telecel Group and the person in charge of its M-commerce service. He is former founder of Net Player Games, founder and Chairman of Youg's, President and CEO of Surcouf and founder of Progressy société.

Personal life 
Hugues Mulliez was born in Paris, France, on 7 August 1975. He is the son of Stéphane Mulliez, creator of Picwic, the grand-nephew of the Auchan group's northern founder, Gérard Mulliez, and the grandson of Francis Mulliez who participated in the establishment of the AFM association. The Mulliez Family Association (AFM) was created in 1955. Its goal was to maintain patriarch's heritage intact and distribute it to 11 children in an equitable manner.

The Mulliez group brings together retail chains in the large food retail, fast food, fashion and sports sectors in France. Auchan, Kiloutou, Decathlon, Leroy Merlin, Kiabi, Flunch, are some of the companies controlled by The Mulliez Family Association.

Hugues Mulliez was charged with manslaughter after admitting to being at the helm of his boat as it collided with a Greek fishing boat with three people aboard on August 9, 2019 off the luxurious Peloponnese resort of Porto Heli, 170 miles southwest of Athens.  Two people were killed and one was seriously injured in the accident.

Hugues Mulliez presently lives in Belgium.

Career 
Hugues Mulliez was born into a family of entrepreneurs. He created his first company at the age of 21, then sold it three years later.

Leroy Merlin, Blanche Porte, 3 Suisses, Auchan 
From 1993 to 1996, Hugues Mulliez served as a salesman at Leroy Merlin, purchasing control trainee at La Blanche Porte and Aux 3 Suisses, and then head of fruit and vegetable department at Auchan.

Net Player Games 
In 1996, Hugues Mulliez founded Net Player Games in Lille, France. The company developed network games and assembled PCs.

Youg’s 
In 1999, Hugues Mulliez created Youg's. In 2000, he opened the first Youg's store in Flers. Youg's was a retailer which distributed IT and digital products. The 3 stores were located in the North of France and the South of Paris, with approximately 100 employees.

Surcouf 
The first Surcouf store was created in 1992 by Olivier Dewavrin and Hervé Collin. Surcouf became a subsidiary of Fnac in April 2001 when it was bought by the PPR group. PPR Group develops a portfolio of high-growth global brands.

In 2009, Hugues Mulliez purchased Surcouf from the PPR Group. Youg's was merged and applied to the management of Surcouf.  Hugues Mulliez served as the President and CEO.

Telecel Group 
Telecel Global was founded in 2007. The firm offers wireless telecommunication services, and was formerly known as Exxon Telecom. Offices are located in South Africa and United Kingdom.

Telecel Group is major player in Africa. Hugues Mulliez serves as the Group Chairman at Telecel. Hugues Mulliez, along with his business partners Nicolas Bourg, Mohamad Damush, and Laurent Foucher, launched Africa Startup Initiative Program in 2019, as part of Telecel Group's CSR programs.

Boards 
Hugues Mulliez serves on the following board:

Telecel Group (Group Chairman)

References 

1975 births
21st-century French businesspeople
Living people